Oshakati is a town in northern Namibia. It is the regional capital of the Oshana Region and one of Namibia's largest places.

Oshakati was founded in July 1966 and proclaimed a town in 1992. The town was used as a base of operations by the South African Defence Force (SADF) during the South African Border War.

History 
In Oshiwambo, the language of the Ovambo people, the town's name means "that which is in between", although some believe that the name (Oshakati, also Otshakati) was used to refer to the broadcasting tower ( high), the tallest structure in the town centre and in Namibia.

On 19 February 1988, a bomb blast occurred in Oshakati at the First National Bank, killing 27 people and badly injuring nearly 30 others, most of them nurses and teachers. No one was ever convicted of the bombing and the issue was dropped upon independence in 1990 in favour of national reconciliation.

Economy and infrastructure 

Oshakati has experienced much development since Namibia achieved independence in 1990. It was proclaimed a town in 1992.

Oshakati is located near the B1, Namibia's main highway, which stretches from South Africa through the capital Windhoek and on to the Angolan border.

Since the turn of the century, there are now many shops like Jet, Mr Price, furniture stores, shoes stores, pharmacies, etc. The three main shopping centres are Game, Etango, and Yetu. The Oshakati Independence Stadium is situated in town.

In April 2006, the Oshakati town council building was inaugurated by Botswana's president Festus Mogae. Dr. Frans Aupa Indongo Open Market sells groceries, dried fish and dried Mopane worms.

Geography

Location
Oshakati is situated in the Cuvelai-Etosha Basin and cut by the Okatana River. Both of these geographic features make the town prone to flooding; in 2008 it was last hit by heavy floods. The Oshakati Master Plan Project is underway to build a  dike around the town, to deepen and straighten the river, and to resettle people living near the riverbed and clogging the flow of water.

Climate
Oshakati has a semi-arid climate (BSh, according to the Köppen climate classification), with hot summers and relatively mild winters (with warm days and cool nights).

Politics
Oshakati is governed by a town council that has seven seats. The town area covers two electoral constituencies, Oshakati East and Oshakati West.

Oshana Region, to which Oshakati belongs, is a stronghold of Namibia's ruling SWAPO party. In the 2015 local authority election SWAPO won by a landslide (4,569 votes) and gained six council seats. The remaining seat went to the Democratic Turnhalle Alliance (DTA) which gained 330 votes. Major Katrina Shimbulu from SWAPO has been serving in this position from 2007 to 2010, and again after the 2015 election.

SWAPO also won the 2020 local authority election. It obtained 3,028 votes and gained four seats. The Independent Patriots for Change (IPC), an opposition party formed in August 2020, obtained 1,887 votes and gained three seats.

Education

Formerly known as the Northern Campus, Oshakati Campus is the oldest satellite campus of the University of Namibia, inaugurated on 7 May 1998 by Sam Nujoma, Founding President of the Republic of Namibia and UNAM founding chancellor.

Many primary and secondary schools are to be found in Oshakati, e.g. Iipumbu, Oshakati, Ngolo, Erundu Secondary School, Cabatana and others, including Afoti Combined School in Uuvudhiya constituency in Oshana Region in the Omapopo cluster of Oshakati Circuit.

The Oshana Regional Study and Resource Center was established on September 17, 2014, through the assistance of the Millennium Challenge Account Namibia (MCA-N). Situated between the GIPF house and the Social Security regional head office in Oshakati, the library can host up to 600 people, has 220 study spaces, a meeting hall that can accommodate 125 seated people, a video conferencing room, and shelving spaces for up to 35,000 books.

Culture
Oshakati town, (popularly known as 'Otshakati tsha Nangombe' by the native Kwambi people) is within the Kwambi traditional authority.

Oshakati Town Council hosts the annual Oshakati Totem Expo. It combines the celebration of local traditions with a modern business exhibition. The event was launched by Oshana governor Clemens Kashuupulwa, on 9 June 2012. It takes place annually for a period of four days in the months of June or July.

Oshakati has a football team, Oshakati City FC.

See also
 Ehenye

References

External links 
 USAID report on HIV/AIDS impact on Namibian municipalities, Volume 3: Oshakati

 
Populated places in the Oshana Region
Regional capitals in Namibia
Towns in Namibia
1966 establishments in South West Africa
Populated places established in 1966